Río San Lorenzo or San Lorenzo River or variant, may refer to:

 San Lorenzo River, California, USA
 San Lorenzo River (Mexico)

See also
 Saint Lawrence River (U.S.-Canada; the Great Lakes)
 San Lorenzo (disambiguation)